Julie Miville-Dechêne (born July 10, 1959) is a Canadian senator and former journalist.

She is a former journalist and broadcaster with Radio-Canada and spent 25 years as a public affairs correspondent for the network in Washington, D.C., Toronto, Ottawa, and Montreal before serving as its ombudsman from April 2007, to July 2011, the first woman to hold this position.

Since August 15, 2011, she has served as the president of the Conseil du statut de la femme.

In 2017, she served as the government of Quebec's representative in Canada's delegation to UNESCO.

On June 20, 2018, she was appointed to the Senate of Canada by Governor General Julie Payette after being nominated by Prime Minister Justin Trudeau.

References

External links
 Biography of Julie Miville-Dechêne

21st-century Canadian civil servants
1959 births
Living people
Place of birth missing (living people)
Ombudsmen in Canada
Canadian Broadcasting Corporation people
Canadian women television journalists
Canadian television reporters and correspondents
Journalists from Quebec
Canadian senators from Quebec
Independent Senators Group
Women members of the Senate of Canada